"'Faccetta Nera'" ("Little Black Face" or "Pretty Black Face") is a popular marching song of Fascist Italy about the Second Italo-Ethiopian War. It was written by Renato Micheli with music by Mario Ruccione in 1935. 

The lyrics are written from the perspective of a fascist Italian Blackshirt soldier during the invasion of Ethiopia. In the song, the Italian narrator tells a beautiful young enslaved Abysinnian (Ethiopian) girl that she will be liberated from slavery and ruled by a new regime. She is invited to parade with the fascist Blackshirts in Rome, where she is promised a new and better life.

Themes
Slavery in Ethiopia is a prominent theme in the song. The song follows the trend of Italian fascist propaganda portraying the invasion not as a war of conquest, but as a war of liberation to abolish Ethiopian slavery.

The song also contains heavily implied themes of interracial romance. The song is noticeably focused on the freedom of only Ethiopian women, and the Italian is fixated on the physical beauty of the young Ethiopian woman. The lyric "La legge nostra è schiavitù d'amore" ("Our law is the slavery of love") suggests that the Italian desires intimacy with the Ethiopian woman besides liberating her from slavery. This is part of the overall trend of Italian media exoticising and sexualising the women of Ethiopia to portray them as objects of sexual conquest who must be rescued from "uncivilised" Ethiopian men.

History

The hymn is said to have been inspired by a beautiful young Abyssinian girl, who was found by the Italian troops at the beginning of the Italian invasion of Ethiopia.

During the invasion, the song was hugely popular in Italy and caused national fervor. During the fascist occupation of Ethiopia, Ethiopian women cohabited with Italian men in a system of concubinage known as madamato.
The implicitly erotic song was, however, somewhat of an embarrassment for the Fascist government, which had, starting in May 1936, introduced several laws prohibiting cohabitation and marriage between Italians and native people of the Italian colonial empire. These efforts culminated in the Italian Racial Laws of 1938. The Fascist authorities considered banning the song, and removed all picture postcards depicting Abyssinian women from Roman shop windows.

Lyrics

See also

 Giovinezza

References

External links 
  Recording as sung by Carlo Buti
 Lyrics

Italian East Africa
Italian-language songs
1935 songs
Italian fascist songs